Christa Schumann-Lottmann (born 3 May 1964) is a Guatemalan sprinter. She competed in the women's 100 metres at the 1984 Summer Olympics.

References

External links
 

1964 births
Living people
Athletes (track and field) at the 1984 Summer Olympics
Athletes (track and field) at the 1987 Pan American Games
Guatemalan female sprinters
Pan American Games competitors for Guatemala
Olympic athletes of Guatemala
Place of birth missing (living people)
Central American Games gold medalists for Guatemala
Central American Games medalists in athletics
Olympic female sprinters